Byron Aldemar Moreno Ruales (born November 23, 1969) is an Ecuadorian former football referee who served in the FIFA World Cup as an International Referee from 1996 to 2003.

Refereeing career
During the 2002 FIFA World Cup, Moreno refereed the round of 16 match between tournament favourites Italy and co-hosts South Korea on June 18. Following Italy's elimination from the tournament after a 2–1 extra time loss, Moreno's performance was criticised for several decisions: he awarded South Korea a controversial penalty in the first half (which eventually failed to capitalise) and later disallowed a possible golden goal by Damiano Tommasi for offside, as well as showing a second yellow card to Francesco Totti for an arguable dive in South Korea's penalty area in the first half extra time while he was 37 meters away from play.

In September 2002, while seeking election to the Quito City Council, Moreno was suspended for twenty matches and investigated by Ecuadorian football authorities. This came after he made timekeeping errors in a match he officiated between L.D.U. Quito and Barcelona S.C. FIFA also investigated him due to controversies "...in Japan, Italy and South America over the past few months". 

In May 2003, in his third game back from suspension, Moreno was again suspended, this time for one match, after he sent off three players from visiting Deportivo Quito in a 1–1 draw with Deportivo Cuenca. He retired the following month, blaming low performance marks for his retirement.

Legal trouble
Moreno was arrested on September 21, 2010 at John F. Kennedy International Airport in New York City while trying to smuggle in six kilograms (over thirteen pounds) of heroin, which was hidden in his underwear. In January 2011, he pleaded guilty to the charges in a New York courthouse, facing a possible ten years in prison. On September 23, 2011, Moreno was sentenced to two-and-a-half years in prison on the heroin smuggling charges.
He was released from prison 26 months later and returned to Ecuador.

References

External links

2002 FIFA World Cup profile (archive)

Ecuadorian football referees
Ecuadorian drug traffickers
FIFA World Cup referees
Sports controversies
1969 births
Living people
Copa América referees
People from Quito
2002 FIFA World Cup referees
People convicted of drug offenses